Troy Xavier Kelley (born 1964) is an American attorney, businessman, and politician who served as the 10th Washington State Auditor from 2013 to 2017, and is a member of the Democratic Party. He is a lieutenant colonel JAG officer in the Washington National Guard.  Kelley was a member of the Washington House of Representatives, representing the 28th Legislative District from 2007 to 2013. In 2017 he was convicted of multiple counts of possession of stolen property, making false declarations in a court proceeding and tax fraud.

He was elected as Washington State Auditor in 2012 and was indicted by the United States Department of Justice for mortgage fraud and related crimes in early 2015. At the end of his first trial on April 26, 2016, he was acquitted of one charge of making false statements. The jury deadlocked on the remaining counts. The trial ended in a mistrial on 14 of the 15 counts. At the end of his retrial on December 20, 2017, he was acquitted of five charges of money laundering, and convicted of nine felony charges including counts of possession of stolen property, making false declarations in a court proceeding and tax fraud. On April 26, 2018, in response to a motion by the defense, prosecutors conceded the count of conviction for corrupt interference with an IRS investigation should be dismissed after the U.S. Supreme Court ruled the government’s theory was contrary to the law. On June 29, 2018, Kelley was sentenced to a year and a day in jail, plus a year's probation. A request for forfeiture of $1.4 million was rejected by the judge and a hearing on restitution was scheduled for September 2018. On July 29, 2020, a three judge panel on the Ninth Circuit Court of Appeals upheld Kelley's conviction.  The United States Supreme Court denied Kelley's appeal and Kelley began serving his 1-year sentence in July 2021.

Electoral history

References

1964 births
Living people
Democratic Party members of the Washington House of Representatives
State auditors of Washington
Washington (state) politicians convicted of crimes